Eratoidea is a genus of sea snails, marine gastropod mollusks in the family Marginellidae, the margin snails.

Species
Species within the genus Eratoidea include:

 Eratoidea aciesa McCleery, 2011
 Eratoidea acuta McCleery, 2011
 Eratoidea acutulla McCleery, 2011
 Eratoidea ampla McCleery, 2011
 Eratoidea boyeri (Bozzetti, 1994)
 Eratoidea brevisa McCleery, 2011
 Eratoidea cochensis McCleery, 2011
 Eratoidea copiosa McCleery, 2011
 Eratoidea costata (Bozzetti, 1997)
 Eratoidea costulata (Thiele, 1925)
 Eratoidea diatreta McCleery, 2011
 Eratoidea espinosai Espinosa & Ortea, 2014 
 Eratoidea estensis McCleery, 2011
 Eratoidea fernandinae (Dall, 1927)
 Eratoidea fuikensis McCleery, 2011
 Eratoidea gigacostata Bozzetti, 2016
 Eratoidea glarea McCleery, 2011
 Eratoidea gorda McCleery, 2011
 Eratoidea grandis McCleery, 2011
 Eratoidea hematita (Kiener, 1834)
 Eratoidea houardi Espinosa & Ortea, 2013
 Eratoidea infera McCleery, 2011
 Eratoidea janeiroensis (E. A. Smith, 1915)
 Eratoidea kieseri Espinosa & Ortea, 2013
 Eratoidea lasallei (Talavera & Princz, 1985)
 Eratoidea lebouti Espinosa & Ortea, 2013
 Eratoidea lefebrei Espinosa & Ortea, 2013
 Eratoidea levisa McCleery, 2011
 Eratoidea lozii McCleery, 2011
 Eratoidea margarita (Kiener, 1834)
 Eratoidea megeae Espinosa & Ortea, 2013
 Eratoidea oettlyi Espinosa & Ortea, 2013
 Eratoidea perspicua McCleery, 2011
 Eratoidea phillipsi McCleery, 2011
 Eratoidea pointieri Espinosa & Ortea, 2013
 Eratoidea ponsia McCleery, 2011
 Eratoidea pustulata McCleery, 2011
 Eratoidea ranguanaensis McCleery, 2011
 Eratoidea recta McCleery, 2011
 Eratoidea robusta McCleery, 2011
 Eratoidea rosarioensis McCleery, 2011
 Eratoidea rugata McCleery, 2011
 Eratoidea rugosa McCleery, 2011
 Eratoidea scalaris (Jousseaume, 1875)
 Eratoidea sinuosa (Bozzetti, 1997)
 Eratoidea sotaventensis McCleery, 2011
 Eratoidea statiola McCleery, 2011
 Eratoidea sulcata (d'Orbigny, 1842)
 Eratoidea tayronata McCleery, 2011
 Eratoidea unionensis McCleery, 2011
 Eratoidea viequesa McCleery, 2011
 Eratoidea watsoni (Dall, 1881)

Species brought into synonymy
 Eratoidea brachia (Watson, 1886): synonym of Mesoginella brachia (Watson, 1886)
 Eratoidea microgonia (Dall, 1927): synonym of Cystiscus microgonia (Dall, 1927)
 Eratoidea scripta (Hinds, 1844): synonym of Cryptospira scripta (Hinds, 1844)
 Eratoidea strangei (Angas, 1877): synonym of Mesoginella strangei (Angas, 1877)

References

 McCleery, T., 2011. A revision of the genus Eratoidea Weinkauff, 1879 (Gastropoda: Marginellidae). Novapex 12: 1-111, sér. HS 8

Marginellidae